Nunu Dzhansuhivna Abashydze Mislayeva (born 27 March 1955 in Novovolynsk) is a retired track and field shot putter from Ukraine, best known for winning the bronze medal for the Soviet Union in the women's shot put event at the 1982 European Championships. She set her personal best (21.53 m) on 20 June 1984 at a meet in Kiev. She is currently a Canadian citizen.

Achievements

References

1955 births
Living people
People from Novovolynsk
Ukrainian female shot putters
Soviet female shot putters
Athletes (track and field) at the 1980 Summer Olympics
Olympic athletes of the Soviet Union
European Athletics Championships medalists
Doping cases in athletics
World Athletics Championships athletes for the Soviet Union
Soviet sportspeople in doping cases
World Athletics Indoor Championships medalists
Friendship Games medalists in athletics
Sportspeople from Volyn Oblast